Vicia andicola is a species of herb in the family Fabaceae. It is native to the Andes from Venezuela to northern Argentina.

References 

andicola
Flora of Argentina
Flora of Peru
Flora of Venezuela